Survivor Turkey is the Turkish version of the popular reality Survivor. This version of the show has aired on both Kanal D in 2005, and on Show TV in 2006, 2007, and 2010. From the beginning Survivor was a success in Turkey, however, the cost of producing the show proved to be too much for Kanal D and even Show TV could not afford to produce the show on a yearly basis. Because of production costs the show was put on hiatus in 2007 and was brought back three years later. The prize for the first seasons of the show was 150,000 euros, for the second and third seasons 250,000 euros, and 500,000 dollars for the fourth season.

Format and rules 

Turkish Survivor followed a similar format as the American Survivor, but with some differences.

In the Turkish version, there are some minor changes in each season when it comes to how the game is played, how contestants are eliminated, and how the game is won. One thing that has not changed throughout the seasons is that in order to win the game a contestant must earn the most "points", these points are typically earned through votes or winning challenges.

Unlike the original series, viewers vote for their favourites to select the winner each week and in the final. The players never cast votes during tribal councils since the inception of the Turkish series which eliminates the most important part of the US series. Another major difference is the length of the show (multiple episodes a week, around 180mins per episode).

Survivor Turkey

All Seasons

First Season (2005): Türkiye: Büyük Macera 
The first season, Survivor Büyük Macera, premiered on March 22, 2005, and aired for thirteen weeks and is the only season that was hosted by Ahmet Utlu. This season resembled Expedition Robinson more so than Survivor in the way that the tribes were divided up into two groups known as the North (Kuzey) and South (Güney) teams. From early on in the game alliances came into play as the four younger members of the North team, Ebru Demiray, Irmak Arkadaşlar, Kemal Pekser, and Selin Yardımcı quickly formed an alliance. Because of this, and the fact that the South team proved better at the challenges, none of the four elder members of the North team made it to the merge. Following the merge, the surviving members of the North team struggled to find a hole in the South team six and were one by one picked off until only former South team members remained in the game. When it came time for the final four the contestants competed in the infamous "Plank" competition. Uğur Pektaş won this first challenge and eliminated Delim from the game. In the second semi-final competition, the other two members of the final three competed against each other for the remaining spot in the final two. They also could earn a point by winning either the viewer vote or the jury vote. Ultimately, it was Uğur Pektaş who won this season over Özgür Şimşek with a higher combined vote count of the jury and public's votes.

Second Season (2006): Türkiye - Yunanistan 

Turkey vs. Greece was the third season of the Survivor to air in Greece and the second season to air in Turkey.

This season was aired from September 2006 to December of that same year. This was the first time that either country's branch of the franchise competed with another country and because of this the major twist this season was that the tribes were divided up by country of origin. The first person to be eliminated this season Vassilis Athanassopoulos, was not voted out but was ejected from the game following the first competition. As an added twist this season, after the merge, the tribe that won immunity would vote for the losing tribe and would count as an extra vote. Early on the Greek tribe struggled to perform at the immunity challenges and because of this the tribe's size quickly dwindled until only four were left (all the others with the exception of Melita Goyait had been voted out). Though the first two immunity challenge after the tribes began to live together were individual, the rest were all tribal. When there were only four members of each tribe left both tribes competed in a duel in which one member of each tribe (Nadia Zagli from the Greeks and Ipek Esin from the Turks) would be eliminated. When only four competitors remained, the two representatives left from each tribe would have to convince the audience to vote for them to compete in the final challenge as their countries representative. Eventually, it was Derya Durmuşlar who won the final competition and claimed victory for Turkey over Amfikratis Zachariadis from Greece.

In 2011, Derya Durmuşlar was killed in a traffic accident.

Third Season (2007): Aslanlar - Kanaryalar
Survivor Aslanlar vs. Kanaryalar was aired from February to June 2007.

The main twist this season was that the tribes were split into two groups, one being Aslanlar (Lions) and the other Kanaryalar (Canaries). An immediate twist this season was the eliminations of Nihal following two early duels. Another twist used during this season was that after a team lost an immunity challenge they were forced to compete in an individual immunity challenge, where the winner would earn immunity and a second vote to cast at tribal council.

As in the previous season, there was no merge; instead the remaining players competed in duel against members of the other team in order to determine who would be eliminated. When it came time for the final six, both tribes' members competed against other members within their own tribe to determine who would be in the final four.

When it came time for the final four, the contestants competed in two competitions. The first of these was won by Ayşıl Özaslan, who won the first spot in the final two. Tnhe second competition was won by Taner Özdeş who won the second spot in the final two. Eventually, it was Taner Özdeş who won this season over fellow Canary Ayşıl Özaslan by a jury vote of 9–0. As two members from the Canary tribe made the final two, only former Canary tribe members were eligible to vote for the winner, with the exception of Aykor.

Fourth Season (2010): Kızlar - Erkekler 
Survivor Kızlar vs. Erkekler (Survivor: Females vs. Males), was aired from April 17, 2010, to September 18, 2010. The main twist this season was that the tribes were divided by color. However, there were some altered rules, and several tribal councils were decided by competitive challenges, rather than votes alone.

Another altered rule was that, prior to the merge, at tribal council the tribe that had immunity would award immunity to someone from the losing tribe through a vote. The women's tribe lost player Nilgün Karataş to an injury she suffered in the first episode cycle. Because this was not a voluntary exit, she was replaced with Seda Aktuğlu in the second episode cycle. Following the second tribal council, the women experienced a long series of losses at the immunity challenge that eventually withered the tribe down to only four women at the merge.

At what was supposed to be the first post-merge vote, the contestants were told that their votes did not count that round and that they would compete in a challenge to determine who would be eliminated. Metin Avşar lost the challenge and was eliminated. At the post-merge tribal councils, the person with immunity was not permitted to vote. However, beginning with the thirteenth tribal council, they would decide who would duel the person that received the most votes. When it came time for the final three, the jury members voted to eliminate one of them. Aydın Gülşen proved to be the least popular of the finalists with the jury and was eliminated. The final two then competed in two challenges in order to earn "points". They also could earn a point by winning either the viewer vote or the jury vote. Ultimately, it was Merve Oflaz who won this season, over İhsan Tarkan, by a point score of 3–1.

Fifth Season (2011): Ünlüler - Gönüllüler 
Survivor Ünlüler vs. Gönüllüler premiered on April 2, 2011, and aired until June 20, 2011. The main twist this season was that one tribe was composed of seven celebrities and the other seven fans of the show. Another twist this season was that when a tribe lost an immunity challenge they would vote to nominate a member of their tribe to face the public vote. At the same time the other tribe would vote for the second nominee. When the tribes merged, this rule change in a way so that the person who was initially voted to be a nominee would pick the second nominee. Ultimately, it was Derya Büyükuncu who won this season over fellow celebrity Nihat Doğan with seventy four percent of the public vote.

Sixth Season (2012): Ünlüler - Gönüllüler 
Survivor Ünlüler vs Gönüllüler 2 aired in 2012. The tribes this year, the Ünlüler ("Celebrities") and the Gönüllüler ("Fans"), were the same as in the 2011 season, which was named Ünlüler vs Gönüllüler; hence the addition of a 2. The episodes were aired on Saturday nights by Show TV; the season premiere took place on March 17, 2012.

Seventh Season (2013): Ünlüler - Gönüllüler 
Survivor Ünlüler vs Gönüllüler 3 aired in 2013. The tribes this year, the Ünlüler ("Celebrities") and the Gönüllüler ("Volunteers"), were the same as in the years 2011 and 2012, which was named Ünlüler vs Gönüllüler; hence the addition of a 3. The episodes were aired on Saturday, Sunday and Monday nights by Star TV; the season premiere took place on March 17, 2013. Host of this season are Acun Ilıcalı and Alp Kırşan.

Eighth Season (2014): Ünlüler - Gönüllüler 
Survivor Ünlüler vs Gönüllüler 4 aired in March until June 2014. The tribes this year, the Ünlüler ("Celebrities") and the Gönüllüler ("Fans"), is the same as in the years 2011, 2012 and 2013, which was named Ünlüler vs Gönüllüler; hence the addition of a 4.

Ninth Season (2015): All Star 
This Season aired by tv8 and was presented by Acun Ilıcalı. Several former castaways claimed to have either declined the offer to return for All-Star or been cut from the cast.

Tenth Season (2016): Ünlüler - Gönüllüler

Eleventh Season (2017): Ünlüler - Gönüllüler

Twelfth Season (2018): Ünlüler - Gönüllüler 
This Season aired by tv8 and was presented by Acun Ilıcalı. Several former castaways claimed to have either declined the offer to return for All-Star or been cut from the cast versus new castaways that have joined the game for the first time.

Emre, İpek, Mustafa, Batuhan, Elif, Yiğit and Berna joined the game after 2 or 4 weeks.

Switched contestants by day, because of All Stars supremacy: Hakan (day 1) – Ecem (day 5) – Nagihan (day 30) – Hilmi Cem (day 52) – Murat (day 52) – Damla (day 52) – Mustafa (day 52).

Thirteenth Season (2019): Türkiye - Yunanistan 
Turkey and Greece tribes mixed day 60, because of Turkey supremacy.

Fourteenth Season (2020): Ünlüler - Gönüllüler 
Survivor 2020 is a TV competition program that started on February 16, 2020, and made the final on July 14, 2020, presented by Acun Ilıcalı and Murat Ceylan. The program was shot in the Dominican Republic. The format of the competition is Survivor Celebrities - Volunteers.

Contestants

Ünlüler
Uğur Pektaş
 Şaziye İvegin Üner                                                                                                                                                      
Tuğba Melis Türk
Erman Altıkardeş
Derya Can Göçen
İrem Akın
Parviz Abdullayev
Ezgi Hocaoğlu
Aşkım Burçe Tunay                                                                                                                                                    
Ersin Korkut
Mert Öcal
Aycan Yanaç
Yunus Emre Özden
Sercan Yıldırım (Sixth)
 Elif Yıldırım Gören (Fifth)

Gönüllüler
Makbule Karabudak
Fatma Günaydın                                                                                                                                                    
İlayda Velibeyoğlu 
Tayfun Erdoğan  
Ceyhun Uzun
Meryem Kasap
Burak Yurdugör
Gizem Birdan 
Sadık Ardahan Uzkanbaş                                                                                                                                                 
Evrim Keklik (Eighth)
Nisa Bölükbaşı (Seventh)
Berkan Karabulut (Fourth)
Yasin Obuz (Third)
Barış Murat Yağcı (Second)
Cemal Can Canseven (Champion)

Weekly Teams

Red Team

Blue Team

Elimination History

(Fifteenth Season): 2021 Survivor: Ünlüler - Gönüllüler 
Survivor 2021 is a TV competition program that started on January 9, 2021 and made the final on June 25, 2021, presented by Acun Ilıcalı and Murat Ceylan. The program was shot in the Dominican Republic. The format of the competition is Survivor Celebrities - Volunteers.

(Sixteenth Season): 2022 Survivor: All Star 
Survivor 2022 All Star was a TV competition program that started on January 15, 2022. It was presented by Acun Ilıcalı and Murat Ceylan. The program was shot in the Dominican Republic. The format of the competition is Survivor Celebrities - Volunteers, who were former contestants.

(Seventeenth Season): 2023 Survivor: Ünlüler - Gönüllüler 
Survivor 2022 All Star is a TV competition program that started on January 15, 2023. It was presented by Acun Ilıcalı and Murat Ceylan. The format of the competition is Survivor Celebrities - Volunteers.

References

Turkish reality television series
Turkey